Phimeanakas (Prasat Phimean Akas, 'celestial temple') or Vimeanakas (Prasat Vimean Akas) at Angkor, Cambodia, is a Hindu temple in the Khleang style, built at the end of the 10th century, during the reign of Rajendravarman (from 941 to 968), then completed by Suryavarman I in the shape of a three tier pyramid as a Hindu temple. On top of the pyramid there was a tower, while on the edge of top platform there are galleries. Phimeanakas is located inside the walled enclosure of the Royal Palace of Angkor Thom north of Baphuon.

Description 
The temple was the focal point of Suryavarman I's capital.  The buildings there from his reign are enclosed by a wall 600 by 250 m, with five gopuram, and include the Southern and Northern Khleangs.

The tower was originally crowned with a golden pinnacle, as Zhou Daguan described it in his report. According to legend, the king spent the first watch of every night with a woman thought to represent a Nāga in the tower, during that time, not even the queen was permitted to intrude. Only in the second watch the king returned to his palace with the queen. If the naga who was the supreme land owner of Khmer land did not show up for a night, the king's day would be numbered, if the king did not show up, calamity would strike his land.

One of the stele states Jayavarman VII, while on a military expedition in Champa, learned that his father Dharanindravarman II had died, and "returned in great haste to aid King Yasovarman II.  Jayavarman's second wife, Indradevi, "...composed in impeccable Sanskrit the inscription...panegyric of her sister" Jayarajadevi, which included biographical detail of Jayavarman VII.

Gallery

References

Hindu temples in Siem Reap Province
Angkorian sites in Siem Reap Province